Henri Temple  (born 1 November 1945 in Montpellier, France), is a French professor, lawyer, philosopher  and politician.

Education 

He received a  Doctor of Juridical Science from University of Montpellier I with a thesis, "Les Sociétés de fait" (Partnerships by conduct or by estoppel).

Professional career 

In 1975, with  Jean Calais-Auloy, he cofounded the first Centre of research in consumer protection. From 2000 to 2012, he became the direction of this Centre. He was also an expert close to the United Nations and European Union. He taught in Côte d'Ivoire, United Kingdom, Belgium, Romania, Brasil, Algeria, Spain, Italy.

He is an international expert specialised in Economical Law and économics.

Engagement in politics 

He is a member of France Arise ("Debout la France"), a Gaullist party founded by Nicolas Dupont-Aignan and is in charge of Foreign Affairs in the shadow Cabinet.

Political philosophy 
He is now well known in several countries for his major contribution to political philosophy with his General theory of the nation (2014). He innovates new concepts as "nationism" (a scientist approach of what a nation is, far from the violent nationalism), or the sociological precautionary principle explaining why and how a population can refuse massive immigration.

Books

Law and economics 
 Les Sociétés de fait, theory, preface of Jean Calais-Auloy, Librairie générale de droit et de jurisprudence, 378 p., 1975.
 English traduction of the Code français de la consommation (with G. Woodroffe), Légifrance, 2003.
 Le droit de la consommation est-il subversif ? In Liber Amicorum, Jean Calais-Auloy, Dalloz, 2004.
 Quel droit de la consommation pour l'Afrique ?, Revue burkinabè de droit, 2004 (Burkina Faso).	 
 Droit de la consommation et économie de marché, Revue marketing et communication, 2005.
 L'OHADA : le droit au service du développement, Accomex, CCI Paris, April 2007.
 La traçabilité des produits alimentaires et non alimentaires, collection Techniques de l'ingénieur, November 2008.
 Une nouvelle mission de l'avocat, la prévention des risques judiciaires et des crises en matière de consommation, Revue française de gestion	industrielle, Ecole de mines de Paris, September 2007.
 Les prescriptions civiles dans les relations entre professionnels et consommateurs, Les petites affiches, June 2009.
 Les mécanismes de réparation, in L'action collective ou action de groupe, Larcier, Belgique, October 2010 (Belgium). 
 La responsabilité du fait des produits, Lamy Affaires, April 2010, p. 40. 
 Droit de la consommation, with Jean Calais-Auloy, Dalloz, 736 p., 2010.
 Les recours collectifs, Liber amicorum Mario Frota, univ. Coïmbra, Portugal, 2012.
 Food Traceability and emerging technologies, Food biology series, Science Publishers, CRC Press (in Collab.D.Montet & Ramesh C. Ray, CIRAD2017 (USA)

Political Philosophy 
 Sentiment national et droit, Sherbrooke university, Canada 2012.
 Traité pratique de droit alimentaire (direction and redaction), 1403 p.
 Sentiment national et droits de l'homme, Cahiers de psychologie politique, n°25, août 2014 
 Théorie générale de la nation. L'architecture du monde,	preface of Gérard Lafay, L'Harmattan, 2014.
 Théorème du nationisme, Contemporaine évidence des nations, Cahiers de psychologie politique, n°27, août 2015
 Changement de paradigme : Les nations comme fondement intellectuel, moral, psycho-sociologique, économique, démocratique et diplomatique de l’architecture du monde, sur le site Le réveil français, 2015 ; et en russe Anri Tamplh, Natsionalnoïé gosoudarstvo... in Miéjdounarodnaïa Konférentsïa: Yalta 1945, éd. Astreïa, Moskva (Russie), 2015,  190 et s.

References

External links
 Fiche sur le site de L'Harmattan
 Notice sur le site de l'IDREF
 Fiche sur le site de la librairie Dialogues
 Article sur le site du Forum démocratique
 Interview par ONE

Politicians of the French Fifth Republic
Debout la France politicians
21st-century French politicians
French legal scholars
20th-century French lawyers
Living people
1945 births
People from Montpellier